The Most Blessed Sacrament Cathedral It is a religious building belonging to the Roman Catholic Church located in the city of Montego Bay in the northwest of the Caribbean island country of Jamaica. It is located on 3 Fort Street.

It is a temple that follows the Roman or Latin rite, being the seat of the Catholic Diocese of Montego Bay (Dioecesis Sinus Sereni).

Formerly a member of the Diocese of Kingston, is now a suffragan of the Metropolitan Archdiocese of Kingston. The present building was built in 1967 with funds from the diocese. All Masses and religious services are offered in English.

See also
Catholic Church in Jamaica
List of cathedrals in Jamaica

References

Roman Catholic cathedrals in Jamaica
Buildings and structures in Montego Bay
Roman Catholic churches completed in 1967
20th-century Roman Catholic church buildings